The 1987 Anchorage mayoral election was held on October 12 and November 3, 1987, to elect the mayor of Anchorage, Alaska. It saw election of Tom Fink.

Incumbent mayor Tony Knowles was term-limited.

Since at no candidate received 40% of the vote in the first round (which at least one candidate was required to obtain to avoid a runoff), a runoff was held between the top-two finishers of the first round.

Candidates
Larry Baker
H. A. "Red" Boucher, member of the Alaska House of Representatives, former Lieutenant Governor of Alaska, and former mayor of Fairbanks, Alaska 
Tom Fink, former Speaker of the Alaska House of Representatives and Republican nominee for governor of Alaska in 1982
Bud Knox
Paul Honeman
Tom O'Shaughnessy
J. E. Stonerock
Mike "Mafia Mike" Von Gnatensky
Dave Walsh

Results

First round

Runoff

Result

Anchorage
Anchorage
1987